Stewart John Greenleaf Sr. (October 4, 1939 – February 9, 2021) was an American politician and attorney who served as a member of the Pennsylvania State Senate from 1979 to 2019. Greenleaf represented the 12th District, which includes portions of eastern Montgomery County and southern Bucks County.

Early life and education
Greenleaf is a 1961 graduate of the University of Pennsylvania and received his J.D. from the University of Toledo College of Law.

Career
He served as an assistant district attorney in Montgomery County from 1970 to 1977 and as an assistant public defender in Bucks County.

In 1971, Greenleaf was elected as a Commissioner for his hometown of Upper Moreland Township, Pennsylvania. After one term, Greenleaf was elected to a seat in the Pennsylvania House of Representatives in 1976. He served a single term in the house before winning his bid for the State Senate in 1978. He was reelected seven times.

Greenleaf considered a run for U.S. Congress in 1993, briefly forming an exploratory committee to challenge Marjorie Margolies. However, he dropped out before the county endorsement convention. In 2000, Greenleaf ran for Congress against incumbent Joe Hoeffel. Greenleaf had represented much of the eastern portion of the congressional district for almost a quarter-century. Ultimately, Hoeffel won the race with nearly 53% of the vote to Greenleaf's 46%. Greenleaf did not have to give up his state senate seat to run for Congress; Pennsylvania state senators serve staggered four-year terms, and Greenleaf was not up for reelection until 2002.

In his last term, Greenleaf was Chairman of the Senate Judiciary Committee and served on the Appropriations, Banking & Insurance, Consumer Protection & Professional Licensure and Environmental Resources & Energy Committees.

Greenleaf chose not to run for re-election in 2018. He endorsed his son, former Montgomery County controller Stewart Greenleaf Jr., as his successor. However, Stewart Jr. was defeated by Democratic challenger Maria Collett.

Greenleaf continued to serve as a partner in his law firm, Elliott Greenleaf, whose attorneys include Montgomery County Commissioner Bruce Castor and former State Rep. Melissa Murphy Weber.

2012 presidential election 

Greenleaf signed up to be on the presidential ballot for the Republican Party's New Hampshire primary. He explained that he did so to focus the debate of the election on the balancing of the federal budget. He filed with the FEC on December 29, and received a total of 24 votes in the primary, 21st place amongst ballot candidates. He won four write-in votes in the Democratic primary, all of which he received in Canaan. Including other write-ins, this tied him with Mitt Romney for third place in the town, behind only Barack Obama and Ron Paul.

Death
Greenleaf died at Holy Redeemer Hospital in Meadowbrook, Pennsylvania, on February 9, 2021, at age 81.

References

External links
Pennsylvania State Senate - Stewart Greenleaf official PA Senate website
Greenleaf for Senate official campaign website
Stewart Greenleaf for America, presidential campaign website (archived)

1939 births
2021 deaths
20th-century American politicians
21st-century American politicians
Candidates in the 2012 United States presidential election
Republican Party members of the Pennsylvania House of Representatives
Pennsylvania lawyers
Republican Party Pennsylvania state senators
People from Montgomery County, Pennsylvania
Public defenders
University of Pennsylvania alumni
University of Toledo College of Law alumni